Lillian Kemble-Cooper (March 21, 1892 –  May 4, 1977) was an English-American actress who had a successful career on Broadway and in Hollywood film.

Biography

Early life
Lillian Kemble-Cooper was a member of the Kemble family, a family of English actors, who reigned over the British stage for decades. She was born as a daughter of stage actor Frank Kemble-Cooper. Her younger brother Anthony Kemble-Cooper (1904–2000) and her elder sister Violet Kemble-Cooper also worked as actors.

Career
Kemble-Cooper first stage appearance was as a member of the chorus in a September, 1914, production of The Chocolate Soldier at the Lyric Theatre, London. She soon after went to the United States, where she appeared in several Broadway productions. In 1919 she appeared in the original Hitchy-Koo. Later in her career she became a film actress and appeared in about 20 films, mostly in minor supporting roles. In Hollywood, Kemble-Cooper portrayed mostly aristocrats, spinsters and servants. She is perhaps best-remembered for her short appearance as Bonnie Blue Butler's nurse in London in Gone with the Wind, the only non-American character in the film.

Personal life and death
In 1923 Kemble-Cooper married former World War I pilot and writer, Louis G. Bernheimer, who died in 1930. Her second husband was actor Guy Bates Post; the marriage lasted for over thirty years until his death in 1968. 

Kemble died on May 4, 1977 in Los Angeles. She was buried at the Hollywood Forever Cemetery.

Selected filmography 

 I Like Your Nerve (1931) - Condesa Vecchio (uncredited)
 Personal Maid's Secret (1935) - Mrs. Palmer (uncredited)
 Three Live Ghosts (1936) - Lady Brockton
 The White Angel (1936) - Parthenope 'Parthe' Nightingale
 A Woman Rebels (1936) - Lady Rinlake (uncredited)
 Ready, Willing, and Able (1937) - Mrs. Buffington (Credits) / Bloomington (in Film)
 We Are Not Alone (1939) - Mrs. Stacey (uncredited)
 Gone with the Wind (1939) - Bonnie's Nurse in London
 Lady with Red Hair (1940) - London Party Guest (uncredited)
 Rage in Heaven (1941) - Nurse (uncredited)
 A Woman's Face (1941) - Nurse (uncredited)
 So Big (1953) - Miss Fister
 Moonfleet (1955) - Mary Hicks (uncredited)
 The King's Thief (1955) - Mrs. Fell
 Gaby (1956) - Mrs. Edward (uncredited)
 D-Day the Sixth of June (1956) - British Nurse (uncredited)
 My Fair Lady (1964) - Lady Ambassador (uncredited) (final film role)

References

External links

1892 births
1977 deaths
English stage actresses
English film actresses
British emigrants to the United States
Actresses from London
20th-century English actresses
Kemble family